The Royal House of Aberffraw was a cadet branch of the Kingdom of Gwynedd originating from the sons of Rhodri the Great in the 9th century. Establishing the Royal court of the Aberffraw Commote would begin a new location from which to rule Wales. The cadet branch achieved the recognised titles of Prince of Wales, King of Wales and were sometimes named King of Aberffraw.

Definitive carbon dating has proven a presence on the site starting roughly between 1st to 4th centuries AD, and also shows a permanent settlement before and during the Roman conquest of Anglesey. With Romans came Christianity, St Beuno's Church, Aberffraw was established in the 7th century, and the place of worship is still being used today, over a millennium afterwards.

When Aberffraw is mentioned, the Royal familial branch explains a historiographical and genealogical term historians use to illustrate of the clear line of succession from Rhodri the Great of Wales through his eldest son Anarawd.

Founding
The Welsh royal family of Aberffraw descended from the Kingdom of Gwynedd, and they also had Sub-Roman Britain origins. The founding member and ancestor of the Kings of Gwynedd was King Cunedda, a Roman soldier who descended from Manaw Gododdin which is modern Clackmannanshire, Scotland. It was Merfyn Frych who inherited the title of the King of Gwynedd in Anglesey from his great uncle, he also inherited the neighboring Kingdoms, these inheritances came from the last direct descendants of Cunedda Wledig the King of Gwynedd. Merfyn Frych was also a descendant of the King of Mann ( / Isle of Man). The Royal house of Aberffraw emerged centuries after the foundation of Gwynedd, the dynasty coincided with a wave of 9th century Viking attacks around much of the British Isles.

The founding of the Royal house of Aberffraw began with the family of Rhodri the Great, he was a son of Merfyn Frych of the Royal House of Gwynedd, Merfyn was also a Manx chief. In the 9th century, Rhodri the Great had inherited Gwynedd from his father and Powys from his mother, and he added Seisyllwg (Ceredigion and Carmarthenshire) by a dynastic marriage to Angharad of Seisyllwg. Subsequently, by marriage and conquest, the Kingdom of Gwynedd was ruled from its capital of Aberffraw, founded by Rhodri's son Anarawd, his descendants for centuries made Aberffraw on Anglesey their early principal family seat, this Royal dynastic line would rule from c.878 until 1283.

Power base
The family were able to assert their influence within Gwynedd, their traditional sphere of influence, but by the 11th century they were ousted from Powys (Mid Wales) and Deheubarth (West Wales) by a series of strong rulers from the House of Dinefwr in Deheubarth by their dynastically junior cousins. The Dinefwr family were descended from the second son of Rhodri the Great. However, Gruffudd ap Cynan Aberffraw was able to recover his heritage and position as Prince of Gwynedd from Norman invaders by 1100. Owain Gwynedd, Gruffudd's son, defeated King Henry II of England and the vast Angevin host in 1157 and 1166, which led to Owain being proclaimed as Princeps Wallensium, the Prince of the Welsh, by other Welsh rulers. This proclamation reasserted and updated the Aberffraw claims to be the principal royal family of Wales, as senior line descendants of Rhodri the Great. This position was further reaffirmed in the biography The History of Gruffydd ap Cynan. Written in Latin, the biography was intended for an audience outside Wales. The significance of this claim was that the Aberffraw family owed nothing to the English king for their position in Wales, and that they held authority in Wales "by absolute right through descent", wrote historian John Davies.

Then by 1216 it was Llywelyn the Great who had received the fealty and homage of the Dinefwr rulers of Deheubarth at the Council of Aberdyfi. With homage and fealty paid by other Welsh lords to Llywelyn at the Council of Aberdyfi, Llywelyn the Great became the de facto first "Prince of Wales" in the modern sense, though it was his son Dafydd ap Llywelyn who was the first to adopt that title. However, the 1282 Conquest of Wales by Edward I greatly reduced the influence of the family. King Edward I of England forced the remaining members of the family to surrender their claim to the title of Prince of Wales under the Statute of Rhuddlan in 1284, which also abolished the independent Welsh peerage. The Aberffraw family members closest to Llywelyn II were imprisoned for life by Edward, while the more distant Aberffraw members went into deep hiding and fell into obscurity. Other members of the family did lay claim to their heritage; they included Owain Lawgoch in the 14th century.

Succession
Royal succession within the House of Aberffraw (as with succession in Wales in general) was a complex matter due to the unique character of Welsh law. According to Hurbert Lewis, though not explicitly codified as such, the edling, or heir apparent, was by convention, custom, and practice the eldest son of the lord or Prince and was entitled to inherit the position and title as "head of the family" from the father. This was effectively primogeniture with local variations. However, all sons were provided for out of the lands of the father, and in certain circumstances so too were daughters (with children born both in and out of wedlock considered legitimate). Men could also claim royal title through the maternal patrimony of their mother's line in certain circumstances (which occurred several times during the period of Welsh independence). The female line of the dynasty was also considered to remain royal, as marriage was an important means of strengthening individual claims to the various kingdoms of Wales and uniting various royal families to that of Aberffraw, or reuniting factions after dynastic civil wars (for example with the marriage of Hywel Dda, a member of the Dinefwr branch of the Aberffraw dynasty, and Elen of Dyfed, daughter of Llywarch ap Hyfaidd, King of Dyfed).

Members of the House of Aberffraw would include Idwal Foel, Iago ab Idwal, Cynan ab Iago, Gruffudd ap Cynan, Owain Gwynedd, Gwenllian ferch Gruffydd, Llywelyn the Great, Llywelyn ap Gruffudd, Dafydd ap Gruffydd, Madog ap Llywelyn and Owain Lawgoch.

Several later Welsh families, including the Wynn family of Gwydir and the Anwyl of Tywyn family, would claim to be heirs of the dynasty.

History
Aberffraw court, was also called 'Llys Llywelyn'. The area was once a Royal demesne, the administrative region of south west on the Isle of Anglesey was split into two commotes of Malltraeth and Llifôn.

The history of the local people in the area goes back 9,000 years to the mesolithic period. The oldest monument in the Aberffraw vicinity is Din Dryfol, a Neolithic burial chamber built in phases beginning 5,000 years ago. Also nearby there is a Bronze Age burial mound Barclodiad y Gawres and was built around 1,500 BC. Beginning in the late Bronze Age the first Hillforts in Britain were founded, Parciau hill fort would have been local to Aberffraw, it was chosen as a home and defensive fort during the Roman occupation. Starting in the 9th century, Mona's (Anglesey) Aberffraw commote was chosen as a Royal court by Rhodri Mawr, who made Aberffraw his home as the King of Wales.

The original structure at Aberffraw was built in 450 AD, the Kingdom of Gwynedd began in conjunction during the 5th century. With help from the Romans who established roads and forts throughout England and Wales, Aberffraw acted as a fort to help repel Irish Celts, who settled the island of Anglesey. Over the following centuries the Royal court grew and the local land farmed. The Kingdom of Wales survived Anglo-Saxon invasions and Viking raids. Eventually the Kingdom was dismantled by the Normans, beginning with Hugh d'Avranches, Earl of Chester from 1086. Aberffraw palace by then became abandoned, the roof had caved in, and nature took over the building turning it to ruin, the Llys must have been rebuilt and there was a palace in use by Llywelyn The Great, but this structure was eventually disassembled around 1317. As well as the later palace, there was a timber wooden structure on site, and a Mound built for a castle type of reinforced fort.

Llys Aberffraw had similarities with the neighboring Llys Rhosyr (a replica is found in St Fagans National Museum of History). Llys Rhosyr was built by Welsh people after the Norman conquest of Wales, which saw Castles and Town Walls of King Edward in Gwynedd built to pacify locals. Llanfaes burgess was moved to Rhosyr from across the island, the relocation of the town allowed Beaumaris Castle to be built in its place.

The Aberffraw palace was used for private and public use, acting as home and a Princely court. During excavations in the 1970s and late '80s an item carbon dated from Roman times was found, however the site was found to be a later prehistoric settlement founded in Roman times. Similar to neighbouring courts, a fierce sandstorm buried the site in 1332, and the site was abandoned since then until excavations in the 20th century.

No remains exist from the Llys, however, the 'Palace Garden' is situated in the village. There is also heritage centre at the former site, the aptly named 'Llys Llewelyn' is open to the public as a museum with a tea room.

Aberffraw Dynasty : King of Wales, Princes of Aberffraw and Lords of Snowdon
The Aberffraw dynasty senior line represented a family who descended from royalty in Gwynedd, but endured civil strife due to Anglo-Welsh wars. Aberffraw itself became a settlement and principal seat for the Princes of Gwynedd in Wales in the High Middle Ages. Llys Aberffraw would have acted as a power base for the most successful war lords in Wales' history, they conquered all of Wales and went to battle with the English, as typified in the signing of the Magna Carta which benefited Llywelyn the Great. Their titles of 'Prince of Aberffraw', 'Lord of Snowdon' were recognized by the English Crown, and the Prince of Gwynedd would receive payments of gold from their subjects. During the Norman invasion of Wales, Llys Aberffraw replaced Deganwy as the capital of Wales, this was its golden age during the rule of Llywelyn ab Iorwerth who was recognised as ruler of all of Wales. The 12th-century court poet Llywarch ap Llywelyn addresses Dafydd ab Owain Gwynedd a son of Owain Gwynedd as 'Lord of Aberffraw' in name, and as 'inherent chief ruler' of all of Wales, Dafydd had married Emma of Anjou, half-sister of Henry II of England. As chief court poet Llywarch also wrote 9 poems about Llywelyn the Great.

The Aberffraw dynasty represented a new era of Welsh people in the Kingdom of Gwynedd, beginning with Gruffudd ap Cynan, whose mother was the daughter of the Irish / Hiberno-Norse, King of Dublin, Olaf Sigtryggsson. Introducing a non Welsh Princess signified another new era for Aberffraw. Gruffudd's son Owain Gwynedd would see the dynasty descend into civil war for decades in the 12th century, the wars were not just in Wales but all over the British Isles from the effects of the Norman Conquest and what became the Angevin period. Generations following Cynan, Llywelyn Ab Iorwerth (the Great) married Joan, Lady of Wales, the daughter of John, King of England, of the Duchy of Normandy in France, who was a descendant of Charlemagne the 'Emperor of Europe', via Rollo the Viking who married into Frankish nobility.

Aberffraw senior line family tree

Gruffudd ap Cynan (c. 1055–1137), Prince of Gwynedd.
 Owain Gwynedd  (c. 1100 – 28 November 1170), Prince of the Welsh, Prince of Gwynedd  Married Cristina ferch Gronw ap Owain ap Edwin.
Hywel ab Owain Gwynedd
Caswallon ap Hywel 
Iorwerth ab Owain (1145–1174).
 Llywelyn ab Iorwerth  (c. 1173 – 11 April 1240), de facto Prince of Wales, Prince of Gwynedd and Powys, Prince of Aberffraw and Lord of Snowdon.
 Rhodri ab Owain Gwynedd  (c. 1146–1195), Lord of Anglesey  Married Annest ferch Rhys ap Gruffudd.

The final Aberffraw Palace
After the death of Gruffudd ap Cynan in 1200, Llywelyn continued to convene Royal court at Aberffraw to the high standard of the neighboring English Kingdom. The Prince's consort was Joan, daughter of King John of England, herself being a Princess who would have entertained court at Aberffraw for Welsh and English royalty. The chapter 'Chronicles of the Prince' in 'A history of Mona' reveals the order of court life to the full extent.

There were 35 court positions being :
The Master of the Palace, The Domestic Chaplain / The Queen's Chaplain, The Steward of the Household / The Steward to the Queen, The Master of the Hawks, The Judge of the Palace, The Master of the Horse / Master of the Horse to the Queen, The Chamberlain / Queen's Chamberlain, The Domestic Bard, The Officer to Command Silence, The Master of the Hounds, The Metheglin (Mead brewer), The Physician of the Palace, The Cup Bearer, The Door Keeper, The Cook / The Queen's Cook, The Sconce bearer / The Queen's Sconce bearer, Woman of the Queen's Chamber, The Door-Keeper to the Queen, The Groom of the Rein, Officer to Support the Prince's Feet at Banquets, The Bailiff of the Royal Demesne, The Apparitor, The Gate-Keeper, The Watchmen of the Palace, The Woodman, The Baker Woman, The Palace Smith, The Laundress, The Chief of Song.

The set up of Royal court was vast with a minimum of 47 positions necessary daily, and in some positions multiple people would be needed. This extravagant set up is reminiscent of the opulence currently on display in the Royal Households of the United Kingdom, this is a retinue that follows King Charles III, himself a descendant of Llywelyn the Great.

After the Dynasty
The Kingdom of Gwynedd, with the Aberffraw dynasty, ended with the assassination of Owain Lawgoch in 1378. Merely a century later it was the Meyrick family of Bodorgan, Anglesey, who were given the Crown lease for the manor lands of the Aberffraw cantref. Llewelyn Ap Heilyn fought at the Battle of Bosworth alongside Henry VII of England. Also known as Henry Tudor, the King was a descendant of Ednyfed Fychan, ancestor of Tudors of Penmynydd who was seneschal to Llywelyn the Great (effectively a Prime ministerial position in government). Then Heilyn's son Meurig ap Llewelyn became captain of the bodyguard to Henry VIII, and was rewarded with the lease. Today, the same family in Aberffraw is represented locally by the Tapps-Gervis-Meyrick baronets.

References

Notes

Cited sources

Online

 - 
 - 

 -

Books

Biographical sources online

Dictionary of National biography source

Dictionary of Welsh biography source

 
Welsh royal houses
House of Gwynedd
Monarchs of Gwynedd